Ben-Dov or Ben Dov (Hebrew: בן דב)  is a Jewish surname that may refer to
Dov Ben-Dov (1927–2020), Israeli sports shooter 
Hanna Ben Dov (1919–2008), Israeli abstract painter 
Ilan Ben-Dov (born 1957), Israeli businessman and investor 
Nitza Ben-Dov (born 1950), Professor of Hebrew and Comparative Literature at the University of Haifa
Shabtai Ben-Dov (1924–1978), Israeli philosopher 
Tova Ben-Dov, President of the Women's International Zionist Organization
Ya'acov Ben-Dov (1882–1968), Israeli photographer and a pioneer of Jewish cinematography in Palestine 
Yaron Ben-Dov (1970–2017), Israeli football player 
Yosi Ben-Dov (born 1950), Israeli educator

Hebrew-language surnames